Clube Atlético Internacional, C. A. Internacional or simply CA Internacional was a football club based in Santos, Brazil.
It was beside Sport Club Americano, the first club from outside the city of São Paulo to compete in an edition of the Campeonato Paulista, in 1906.  It was founded on November 2, 1902, by Henrique Porchat, responsible for introducing football in the coastal city. It ended its activities in 1910, and part of its dissidents founded the current Santos Futebol Clube, preserving the same colors used by CA Internacional (black and white)

Represented Brazil before the Brazil national football team had established, playing matches against Argentina and Uruguay.

Participations 

Campeonato Paulista:
3 (1906, 1907, 1908)

Honours 

Campeonato Citadino de Santos:
Winners (2): 1903, 1904

References

Association football clubs established in 1902
1902 establishments in Brazil
Association football clubs disestablished in 1910
Defunct football clubs in São Paulo (state)